Tonry is a surname. Notable people with the surname include:

 Don Tonry (1935–2013), American gymnast
 Michael Tonry (born 1945), American criminologist and professor
 Richard Alvin Tonry (1935–2012), American politician
 Richard J. Tonry (1893–1971), American politician

See also
 Torry (name)